Choi Won-myeong is a South Korean actor and model. He is best known for his roles in dramas such as The Three Witches, Great First Wives, Wok of Love and Strong Girl Bong-soon.

Filmography

Television series

Web series

Television shows

Music video appearances

Theatre

Awards and nominations

References

External links 
 
 

1994 births
Living people
21st-century South Korean male actors
South Korean male models
South Korean male television actors
South Korean male film actors